AAEA may refer to:

 African American Environmentalist Association
 Association of African Election Authorities
 Agricultural & Applied Economics Association